"Take Courage" is a song by California-based worship group Bethel Music and Kristene DiMarco. It was released on May 8, 2017, as the lead single from Bethel's ninth live album, Starlight (2017), and Kristene DiMarco's third studio album, Where His Light Was (2017). The song also appeared on the album Bethel Music en Español (2019). The song was written by DiMarco, Jeremy Riddle, and Joel Taylor, with production being handled by Ran Jackson and Chris Greely.

Background
In an interview with Kevin Davis of New Release Today, DiMarco said: 

On the composition of the song, she stated:

Critical reception
New Release Todays Kevin Davis claimed "This song is all about having a strong faith. Without faith it is impossible to please God. Sometimes we have a tendency to think we can try to know everything. God tells us in the Bible that with faith, we can do anything in Christ. I'm completely convicted by the strong lyrics and find immense comfort in this song filled with biblical truth. Like her previous songs, 'It is Well' and 'I Will Follow You', Kristene has once again written a song that touches my heart and meets me where I am spiritually." Laura Chambers of Today's Christian Entertainment said "'Take Courage' encourages us to wait for God to reveal His way in due time, never losing faith that He will come through for us. Kristene DiMarco reminds herself of God's promise to complete what He started. We can find Him while we faithfully await the victory He'll bring. The strength of her voice complements the power she knows God wields, before softening as though one were falling asleep assured of their safety."

Charts

Release history

References

2017 singles
2017 songs
Bethel Music songs
Songs written by Jeremy Riddle